Near Death Experience is the second album by the experimental black metal band Spektr.

Track listing
The Violent Stink Of Twitching Terror  - 08:15
Astral Descent  - 04:10
Climax  - 03:46
Phantom Reality  - 09:35
Visualization  - 02:51
Whatever The Case May Be  - 06:02
Disturbing Signal  - 01:55
Unio Mystica  - 03:06
His Mind Ravaged, His Memory Shattered  - 07:36

Musicians
 (aka Krig) - drums, vocals, samples, programming
 - guitars, bass, vocals, samples, programming

References

External links
Candlelight Records product site

2006 albums
Spektr (band) albums